The Louisiade Rural LLG is a local level government in the Milne Bay Province of Papua New Guinea. The LLG is situated in the Louisiade Archipelago. At the 2011 census, it contained 23,335 residents living in 4,542 households. The LLG president is Benjamin Kuli. It launched its own microfinance scheme in December 2016.

Wards
01. Mwabua
02. Narian
03. Bwagaoia
04. Hinaota
05. Kaubwaga
06. Boiou
07. Siagara East
08. Siagara West
09. Gulewa
10. East Liak
11. West Liak
12. Bagilina
13. Ewena
14. Ebora
15. Bwagabwaga
16. Awaibi
17. Alhoga
18. Eaus North
19. Eaus South
20. Gaibobo
21. Kimuta
22. West Panaeati
23. East Panaeati
24. Panapompom
25. Brooker Island
26. Motorina East
27. Motorina West
28. Bagaman
29. Panaumala
30. Baimatana
31. Loba
32. Bwana

References

Local-level governments of Milne Bay Province